The 1987 Guarujá Open was a men's tennis tournament held in Guarujá in Brazil and played on outdoor hard courts. It was part of the 1987 Nabisco Grand Prix. It was the second edition of the tournament and took place from 26 January through 2 February 1987. Luiz Mattar won the singles title.

Finals

Singles
 Luiz Mattar defeated  Cássio Motta 6–3, 5–7, 6–2
 It was Mattar's first singles title of his career.

Doubles
 Luiz Mattar /  Cássio Motta defeated  Martin Hipp /  Tore Meinecke 7–6, 6–1
 It was Mattar's 1st title of the year and the 1st of his career. It was Motta's only title of the year and the 8th of his career.

References

External links
 ITF tournament edition details

 
Guaruja Open
Guarujá Open